Johann Anton Eismann (1604–1698) was an Austrian painter.

Eismann was born in Salzburg, and was active in Verona and Venice. He painted primarily harbor and some battle genre scenes. He died in Venice in 1698.

References

1604 births
1698 deaths
17th-century Austrian painters
Austrian male painters
Austrian genre painters
Expatriates of the Holy Roman Empire in the Republic of Venice